The Piranha V Infantry Fighting Vehicle (IFV) is one variant of the fifth generation of the Mowag Piranha family of vehicles. It was designed by General Dynamics European Land Systems - Mowag GmbH.

Design

Mobility
While the Piranha V is available with a MTU 6V199 TE21 diesel engine producing 430 kW, both Denmark and Spain have opted for a different Powerpack built by the Spanish company SAPA, consisting of a Scania Diesel engine with 480 kW coupled with the SW 624 automatic transmission, and an auxiliary power unit with 75 kW

Protection
Standard armour (STANAG 4569, Level 4/4b) offers all-round 14.5mm AP protection and 20mm-23mm AP on front. Can offer full protection for the crew if a 10 kg explosive AT mine explodes under the hull.
Add-ons can offer all-round protection to 25mm AP rounds and level 5 STANAG 4569.

Operational history

Romania
In 2017, Romania signed a 900 million euro contract with General Dynamics European Land Systems (GDELS) for the purchase and production of 227 Piranha V armored personnel carriers in Romania. Besides production, a military vehicle maintenance will also operate at UMB.

The first batch of 36 vehicles, was produced at GDELS-Mowag's facilities in Kreuzlingen, Switzerland, 10 of which were assembled in Bucharest. The first batch included 30 vehicles in Infantry Fighting Vehicle configuration equipped with 30 mm cannons, and 6 in mobile command point configuration, and was assigned to the 26th Infantry Battalion "Neagoe Basarab", also known as the Red Scorpions, in October 2020. A second batch of 32 vehicles assembled at UMB, was received in November 2022. Another 26 Piranhas will be received in different configurations, including mortar carriers, equipped with Spear MK2 120 mm mortars, ambulances, CBRN, and recovery vehicles. The rest of the vehicles will be entirely produced in Romania. On 10 February 2023, it was announced that Romania will purchase another 150 Piranha V for an estimated cost of 674 million US dollars.

Operators

  Danish Army - in the process of acquiring 309, first delivered in May 2017, last expected to be delivered by 2023.
  Monégasque Carabiniers – 2 Piranha V.
  
 Spanish Army – 5 units acquired in 2015 as prototypes for the VBMR program, in order to replace the existing BMR and VEC cavalry vehicles. First batch of 348 vehicles, to start replacing in 2020 a total of 1200 vehicles of several types.
 Spanish Navy Marines - An undetermined number of Piranha V with 120 mm guns will substitute the M60A3 in service.
 Romanian Land Forces - 94 delivered by the end of 2022

References

Armoured fighting vehicles of the post–Cold War period
Wheeled infantry fighting vehicles
General Dynamics land vehicles
Armoured personnel carriers
Military vehicles introduced in the 2010s
Mowag Piranha